FinanzBuch Verlag is a German non-fiction book publisher located in Munich, Germany. It is a brand within the Münchner Verlagsgruppe, which has been a subsidiary of Swedish media conglomerate Bonnier Group since 2017.

History 
FinanzBuch Verlag was founded in 1997 by Christian Jund as a financial book publisher. Initially the firm distributed translations of English books, but expanded into original content, collaborating with other media firms such as Financial Times Deutschland.

After the Dot-com bubble collapsed in 2001, the publisher expanded their niche beyond financial books and ventured into politics. Since then the publisher has earned a reputation as a libertarian-friendly publisher. They have published high-profile German-language editions of figures such as Donald Trump and Peter Thiel.

In 2017, the publisher's owner was acquired by the Swedish media conglomerate Bonnier Group.

Criticism 
FinanzBuch has published authors covering a number of controversial topics, including "Euro skepticism" and culture war. This has invited criticism the publisher is fostering far-right politics, however others have argued the topics are "economic rather than ethnic concerns.

In 2018, FinanzBuch was widely criticized for publishing controversial economist Thilo Sarrazin, whose best-selling book was cancelled by Random House. The book had been accused of having the potential to "reinforce anti-Muslim sentiments." The publisher said they carefully thought about publishing the book, deciding "[it is a part of a liberal democracy is that all opinions may be represented as long as they do not violate legal regulations."

References 

Companies of Germany
Publishing companies of Germany
Publishing companies established in 1997